The 2020 French Open is described here in detail, in the form of day-by-day summaries.

All dates and times are CEST (UTC+2)

Day 1 (27 September)
 Seeds out:
 Men's Singles:  David Goffin [11],  Borna Ćorić [24],  Alex de Minaur [25],  Dan Evans [32]
 Women's Singles:  Johanna Konta [9],  Anett Kontaveit [17],  Dayana Yastremska [24]
 Schedule of Play

Day 2 (28 September)
 Seeds out:
 Men's Singles:  Daniil Medvedev [4],  Gaël Monfils [8],  Fabio Fognini [14],  Félix Auger-Aliassime [19],  Filip Krajinović [26],  Hubert Hurkacz [29]
 Women's Singles:  Madison Keys [12],  Markéta Vondroušová [15],  Angelique Kerber [18],  Karolína Muchová [22],  Svetlana Kuznetsova [28],  Magda Linette [31]
 Schedule of Play

Day 3 (29 September)
 Seeds out:
 Men's Singles:  Nikoloz Basilashvili  [31]
 Women's Singles:  Alison Riske [19],  Jennifer Brady [21],  Donna Vekić [26]
 Men's Doubles:  Raven Klaasen /  Oliver Marach [10]
 Schedule of Play

Day 4 (30 September)
 Seeds out:
 Men's Singles:  John Isner [21],  Benoît Paire [23]
 Women's Singles:  Serena Williams [6],  Victoria Azarenka [10],  Yulia Putintseva [23],  Barbora Strýcová [32]
 Women's Doubles:  Lyudmyla Kichenok /  Nadiia Kichenok [15]
 Schedule of Play

Day 5 (1 October)
 Seeds out:
 Men's Singles:  Denis Shapovalov [9],  Dušan Lajović [22],  Jan-Lennard Struff [30]
 Women's Singles:  Karolína Plíšková [2],  Elena Rybakina [14],  Sloane Stephens [29]
 Men's Doubles:  Łukasz Kubot /  Marcelo Melo [4]
 Women's Doubles:  Lucie Hradecká /  Andreja Klepač [11]
 Schedule of Play

Day 6 (2 October)
 Seeds out:
 Men's Singles:  Stan Wawrinka [16],  Taylor Fritz [27],  Casper Ruud [28]
 Women's Singles:  Elise Mertens [16],  Maria Sakkari [20],  Amanda Anisimova [25],  Ekaterina Alexandrova [27]
 Men's Doubles:  John Peers /  Michael Venus [11]
 Women's Doubles:  Laura Siegemund /  Vera Zvonareva [12]
 Schedule of Play

Day 7 (3 October)
 Seeds out:
 Men's Singles:  Matteo Berrettini [7],  Roberto Bautista Agut [10],  Cristian Garín [20]
 Women's Singles:  Aryna Sabalenka [8],  Garbiñe Muguruza [11],  Petra Martić [13]
 Men's Doubles:  Marcel Granollers /  Horacio Zeballos [2],  Jérémy Chardy /  Fabrice Martin [14],  Austin Krajicek /  Franko Škugor [16]
 Women's Doubles:  Elise Mertens /  Aryna Sabalenka [3]
 Schedule of Play

Day 8 (4 October)
 Seeds out:
 Men's Singles:  Alexander Zverev [6]
 Women's Singles:  Simona Halep [1],  Kiki Bertens [5]
 Men's Doubles:  Ivan Dodig /  Filip Polášek [5],  Pierre-Hugues Herbert /  Nicolas Mahut [6],  Jean-Julien Rojer /  Horia Tecău [12],  Jürgen Melzer /  Édouard Roger-Vasselin [15]
 Women's Doubles:  Hsieh Su-wei /  Barbora Strýcová [1],  Gabriela Dabrowski /  Jeļena Ostapenko [5],  Veronika Kudermetova /  Zhang Shuai [8],  Hayley Carter /  Luisa Stefani [10],  Coco Gauff /  Caty McNally [16]
 Schedule of Play

Day 9 (5 October)
 Seeds out:
 Men's Singles:  Karen Khachanov [15],  Grigor Dimitrov [18]
 Men's Doubles:  Rajeev Ram /  Joe Salisbury [3]
 Women's Doubles:  Květa Peschke /  Demi Schuurs [6],  Viktória Kužmová /  Kristýna Plíšková [13]
 Schedule of Play

Day 10 (6 October)
Play was set to start at 1200 CEST, but due to inclement weather in the latter half of the previous day, the women's singles fourth round match of Ons Jabeur and Danielle Collins was moved from Court Suzanne Lenglen to Court Philippe Chatrier to be started at 1100 CEST, with the quarterfinals matches to follow shortly thereafter.

 Seeds out:
 Men's Singles:  Dominic Thiem [3]
 Women's Singles:  Elina Svitolina [3],  Ons Jabeur [30]
 Men's Doubles:  Jamie Murray /  Neal Skupski [13]
 Women's Doubles:  Sofia Kenin /  Bethanie Mattek-Sands [9]
 Schedule of Play

Day 11 (7 October)
 Seeds out:
 Men's Singles:  Andrey Rublev [13],  Pablo Carreño Busta [17]
 Women's Doubles:  Shuko Aoyama /  Ena Shibahara [7]
 Schedule of Play

Day 12 (8 October)
 Seeds out:
 Women's Singles:  Petra Kvitová [7]
 Men's Doubles:  Juan Sebastián Cabal /  Robert Farah [1],  Wesley Koolhof /  Nikola Mektić [9]
 Schedule of Play

Day 13 (9 October)
 Seeds out:
 Men's Singles:  Stefanos Tsitsipas [5],  Diego Schwartzman [12]
 Women's Doubles:  Barbora Krejčíková /  Kateřina Siniaková [4]
 Schedule of Play

Day 14 (10 October)
 Seeds out:
 Women's Singles:  Sofia Kenin [4]
 Men's Doubles:  Mate Pavić /  Bruno Soares [7]
 Schedule of Play

Day 15 (11 October)
 Seeds out:
 Men's Singles:  Novak Djokovic [1]
 Women's Doubles:  Alexa Guarachi /  Desirae Krawczyk [14]
 Schedule of Play

References

Day-by-day summaries
French Open by year – Day-by-day summaries